Adrenalitis is the inflammation of one or both adrenal glands, which can lead to an insufficiency of adrenaline or noradrenaline.

Types can include:
 Xanthogranulomatous adrenalitis
 Autoimmune adrenalitis (a major cause of Addison's disease)
 Hemorrhagic adrenalitis

References

External links 

Adrenal gland disorders